Igor Anddreyevich Borisov (5 April 1924 – 10 October 2003) was a Russian rower who competed for the Soviet Union in the 1952 Summer Olympics.

In 1952 he won the silver medal as crew member of the Soviet boat in the eight event.

References

External links
 

1924 births
2003 deaths
Russian male rowers
Soviet male rowers
Olympic rowers of the Soviet Union
Rowers at the 1952 Summer Olympics
Olympic silver medalists for the Soviet Union
Olympic medalists in rowing
Medalists at the 1952 Summer Olympics
European Rowing Championships medalists